This is a list of North American nations by GDP per capita.  All figures are based on the gross domestic product (at purchasing power parity) per capita, i.e., the purchasing power parity (PPP) value of all final goods and services produced within a country in a given year, divided by the average (or mid-year) population for the same year. The figures given are in international dollars and rounded to the nearest hundred. Names of dependent territories (not sovereign states) are in italics and are not ranked.

See also
List of countries by GDP (PPP) per capita 
List of North American countries by GDP PPP
North American Free Trade Agreement (NAFTA)
CARICOM

References

North America
GDP (PPP) per capita
GDP (PPP) per capita